2018 World Ice Hockey Championships may refer to:

 2018 Men's World Ice Hockey Championships
 2018 IIHF World Championship
 2018 World Junior Ice Hockey Championships
 2018 IIHF World U18 Championships